Arkadi is a former municipality in the Rethymno regional unit, Crete, Greece. Since the 2011 local government reform it is part of the municipality Rethymno, of which it is a municipal unit. Population 6,936 (2011). The seat of the municipality was in Adele. Arkadi is renowned for its famous monastery. It is the site of the Holocaust of Arkadi.

References

Populated places in Rethymno (regional unit)